Lasioglossum ephialtum is a species of sweat bee in the family Halictidae. A common name is nightmare sweat bee.

References

Further reading

 

ephialtum
Insects described in 2010